Michael Peterson (born January 4, 1967 in Gulph Mills, Pennsylvania) is an American rower. He competed in the 1996 Olympic games in Atlanta, Georgia, USA.

References 
 
 

1967 births
Living people
American male rowers
Sportspeople from Montgomery County, Pennsylvania
Olympic rowers of the United States
Rowers at the 1996 Summer Olympics

World Rowing Championships medalists for the United States
People from Upper Merion Township, Pennsylvania